The following list of g-funk artists and producers includes artists and producers who have been described as a part of the G-funk scene at some point in their career. G-funk is a sub-genre of gangsta rap, that emerged in the late '80s and early '90s. Artists who made a couple of songs in the genre but did not fully partake in the genre, such as The D.O.C. on ("The Formula"), and The Notorious B.I.G. on ("Big Poppa"), are omitted from the list.

G-funk artists and producers

 213
 2Pac
 5th Ward Boyz
 Above the Law
 Big Mello
 Bone Thugs-N-Harmony
 C-Bo (The Autopsy era)
 Cold 187um
 Compton's Most Wanted
 Coolio
 Daz Dillinger
 DJ Quik
 Dr. Dre
 Eazy-E
 E.S.G.
 Geto Boys
 Ice Cube
 Jermaine Dupri
 Kokane
 Kurupt
 Lil Zane
 Low Profile
 Mac Dre
 Mack 10
 MC Hammer (The Funky Headhunter era)
 Mista Grimm
 Nate Dogg
 N.W.A
 Paperboy
 Scarface (The Untouchable era)
 Snoop Dogg
 Spice 1
 Tha Dogg Pound
 Thug Life
 Warren G
 Westside Connection
Ohio Players
https://en.m.wikipedia.org/wiki/Cardo_(record_producer)

References

G-funk